The 1950 Idaho gubernatorial election was held on November 7 to elect the next governor of Idaho, alongside elections to the United States Senate, elections to the U.S. House, and other state and local elections.

Idaho changed the term for governor from two to four years starting with the 1946 election, and the incumbent was not allowed to run for a second term (self-succession) until 1958. Republican nominee Leonard B. Jordan defeated Democratic nominee Calvin E. Wright with 52.56% of the vote.

Governor C. A. Robins ran for the U.S. Senate, but lost in the August primary to Herman Welker.

Primary elections
Primary elections were held on August 8, 1950.

Democratic primary

Candidates
Calvin Wright, Rupert, former state auditor
Arnold Williams, St. Anthony, former governor
George Hersley, Boise, state grange master

Republican primary

Candidates
Len Jordan, Grangeville businessman and farmer, former state senator
Reilly Atkinson, Boise businessman, former state party chairman
J.D. Price, Malad, former secretary of state
George Vaughn, Payette, former state safety director
Seth Harper, Shoshone, former manager of state liquor dispensary

General election

Candidates
Leonard B. Jordan, Republican 
Calvin E. Wright, Democratic

Results

References

1950
Idaho
Gubernatorial